Thomas John Nomina (born December 27, 1941) is a former American football defensive tackle in the American Football League who played for the Denver Broncos and Miami Dolphins. He played college football for the Miami RedHawks.

He was drafted in the National Football League by the Los Angeles Rams but decided on a career in the American Football League instead.

References

1941 births
Living people
American football defensive tackles
Denver Broncos players
Miami Dolphins players
Miami RedHawks football players
People from Delphos, Ohio
Players of American football from Ohio